Alexeyevka is a rural locality (a selo) and the administrative center of Alexeyevsky District of Samara Oblast, Russia. Population:

References

Notes

Sources

Rural localities in Samara Oblast